Philipp Frank (March 20, 1884 – July 21, 1966) was a physicist, mathematician and philosopher of the early-to-mid 20th century. He was a logical positivist, and a member of the Vienna Circle. He was influenced by Mach and was one of the Machists criticised by Lenin in Materialism and Empirio-criticism.

Biography
He studied physics at the University of Vienna and graduated in 1907 with a thesis in theoretical physics under the supervision of Ludwig Boltzmann. He joined the faculty there in 1910. Albert Einstein recommended him as his successor for a professorship at the German Charles-Ferdinand University of Prague, a position which he held from 1912 until 1938. Doctoral students included Reinhold Furth and Peter Bergmann.

In 1938, he was invited by Harvard University to America as a visiting lecturer on quantum theory and the philosophy of modern physics. The Germans having invaded Czechoslovakia as he was about to begin his scheduled lecture tour, Frank, a Jew, never returned to his position at Prague. And instead became a lecturer on physics and mathematics at Harvard from that year until his retirement in 1954.

In 1947 he founded the Institute for the Unity of Science as part of the American Academy of Arts and Sciences (AAAS). This arose after Howard Mumford Jones (then president of the AAAS) had issued a call to overcome the fractionalization of knowledge, which he felt the AAAS well suited to address. The institute held regular meetings attracting a broad range of participants. Quine regarded the organisation as a "Vienna Circle in exile". Politically Frank was a socialist.

Astronomer Halton Arp described Frank's Philosophy of Science class at Harvard as being his favorite elective.

His younger brother Josef Frank was a noted architect and designer.

Frank on Mach's principle
In lectures given during World War II at Harvard, Frank attributed to Mach himself the following graphic expression of Mach's principle:

"When the subway jerks, it's the fixed stars that throw you down."

In commenting on this formulation of the principle, Frank pointed out that Mach chose the subway for his example because it shows that inertial effects are not shielded (by the mass of the earth): The action of distant masses on the subway-rider's mass is direct and instantaneous. It is apparent why Mach's Principle, stated in this fashion, does not fit with Einstein's conception of the retardation of all distant action.

Select publications
Philosophy of Science, Prentice Hall (1957)
Einstein: His Life and Times, A. A. Knopf (1947); 2nd edition, Da Capo Press (2002)
Foundations of Physics, University of Chicago Press (1946)
 "Einstein's Philosophy of Science," Review of Modern Physics, 21, 349 (1949)

See also
 List of Austrian scientists

References

Further reading 

 Holton, Gerald, Edwin C. Kemble, W. V. Quine, S. S. Stevens, and Morton G. White. “In Memory of Philipp Frank.” Philosophy of Science 35, no. 1 (1968): 1–5.
 Interview of Philipp Frank by Thomas S. Kuhn on 16 July 1962, Niels Bohr Library & Archives, American Institute of Physics, College Park, MD USA

External links
 Oral history interview transcript with Philipp Frank on 16 July 1962, American Institute of Physics, Niels Bohr Library & Archives
 "Frank, Philipp ." Complete Dictionary of Scientific Biography. Encyclopedia.com. 
 A biography at McTutor History of Mathematics archive. 

Vienna Circle
Philosophers of science
University of Vienna alumni
Harvard University faculty
Jewish philosophers
Czech Jews
Czechoslovak emigrants to the United States
Scientists from Vienna
1884 births
1966 deaths
Jewish emigrants from Austria to the United States after the Anschluss
Austrian socialists
Fellows of the American Physical Society